Khingala, also transliterated Khinkhil, Khinjil or Khinjal, (Sharada script:  khiṃ-gā-la, ruled circa 775-785 CE) was a ruler of the Turk Shahis. He is only known in name from the accounts of the Muslim historian Ya'qubi and from an epigraphical source, the Gardez Ganesha. The identification of his coinage remains conjectural.

Arabic accounts
The Muslim historian Ya'qubi (died 897/8) in his Ta'rikh ("History"), recounts that the third Abbasid Caliph Al-Mahdi (ruled 775-785 CE) asked for, and apparently obtained, the submission of various Central Asian rulers, including that of the Kabul Shah. Al-yaqubi seems to give the name of the Kabul Shah as "Ḥanḥal", but the reading is uncertain. But a later handwritten copy of the book is known to transcribe the name as "Khanjal". The original account by Ya'qubi reads:

The name "Khanjal" has been variously reconstructed as "Khinkhil", "Khinjil" or "Khinjal", and is very similar to the name of an earlier Alchon Hun ruler named Khingila (5th century CE). According to historian Rezakhani, the name mentioned by Ya'qubi is "obviously a namesake" of Khingila.

Epigraphy

[[File:Ganesha from Gardez.jpg|thumb|The Gardez Ganesha from Gardez, Afghanistan, was dedicated by Khiṃgāla.]]
The Gardez Ganesha is a statue of the Hindu god Ganesha, discovered in Gardez, near Kabul in Afghanistan. It is considered as "a typical product of the Indo-Afghan school". A dedicatory inscription appears on the base of the statue. It is written in the Siddhamatrika script, a development of the Brahmi script. An analysis of the writing suggests a date from the 6th or 8th century CE.

The identity of this Khingala is uncertain. A famous Khingila is known from the dynasty of the Alchon Huns, and one of his coins has the legend "Deva Shahi Khingila"  (10px16px "God-King Khingila"), but he is dated quite earlier, to the 5th century CE.

Given the stylistically probable mid-8th century date for the Ganesha, the Śrī Ṣāhi Khiṃgāla'' of the inscription may have been identical with the Turk Shahi ruler of Kabul known in Arab sources as Khinkhil or Khinjil, who, according to Ya'qubi, gave his submission to Al-Mahdi in 775-785.

Relation with Bo Fuzhun

There is a possibility that the Khinkhil of the Arabs is identical with the Turk Shahi Bo Fuzhun (勃匐準) of the Chinese sources, which mention that he was the son of Fromo Kesaro and acceded to the throne precisely in 745 CE.

References

Notes

Sources

  
 
 
 

 
 

Turkic dynasties
Dynasties of Afghanistan
Kabul Shahi